Tithonus is a figure in Greek mythology known for being granted immortality without eternal youth.

Tithonus may also refer to:

 "Tithonus" (poem), a poem by Alfred, Lord Tennyson
 Tithonus poem, a mostly complete fragment of a poem by Saphho
 "Tithonus" (The X-Files), an episode of the TV series The X-Files
 6998 Tithonus, a Trojan asteroid
 Tithonus Birdwing, Ornithoptera tithonus, a birdwing butterfly
 Tithonus, one of over 100 subgenera within the weevil genus Otiorhynchus

See also
 Tithonos, son of Eos and Cephalus in Greek mythology
 Tithonian, the final stage of the Late Jurassic epoch
 Titon et l'Aurore, an opera by the French composer Jean-Joseph de Mondonville